Kinetica Sports Ltd is a global sports nutrition brand headquartered in County Meath, Ireland.

Products 
Kinetica Sports makes health and wellness products for the public and elite athletes like Olympians and professional sports people. Every batch of the Kinetica Sports product range is tested to comply to WADA (World Anti-Doping Agency) standards.

Partnerships 
Kinetica is the sports nutrition partner for sport associations and teams, including: 

 Modest! Golf
 Connacht Rugby
 Rowing Ireland
 Cycling Ireland
 Dublin GAA
 West Ham United Women

Kinetica Sports has sponsored and exhibited at several events, including the ISPS Handa World Invitational, Thrive, Dubai Muscle Show and co-hosted Move at the Manor, the first of its kind fitness event post COVID restrictions beginning to lift.

See also
 High-protein diet
 Whey protein

References

External links
 Kinetica Sports - Official website
 Boyne Valley Group - Official website

Food manufacturers of the Republic of Ireland
Sports nutrition and bodybuilding supplement companies
2009 establishments in Ireland
Food and drink companies established in 2009
County Cork